Bideford RFC is an English Rugby union team formed in 1926. The club is based in Bideford, Devon and operates four senior men's teams, as well as multiple youth, ladies and mini teams. The first team, the Chiefs play in Tribute Western Counties West following their relegation from Tribute South West 1 West at the end of the 2017–18 season.   The club has a longstanding rivalry with its neighbour, Barnstaple, and the traditional Boxing Day fixture between the two sides often attracts crowds in excess of a thousand supporters. Bideford plays home games at King George's Field.

History

Early days
Bideford was founded in 1926 by local players who had, until then, played for its neighbour, Barnstaple RFC. It was the beginning of a long sporting rivalry between the clubs. Bideford played their first game at Victoria Park against a Barnstaple reserve side. Victoria Park remained Bideford's home ground until 1929 when they moved to the Sports Ground. This ground was shared with the local football side, Bideford AFC. During the 1930s, the club had a degree of success in the Devon Junior Cup (the secondary cup competition for men's rugby at the time), winning the competition in 1933 and 1935. In 1969, Bideford left the Sports Ground and moved to King George's Field, where they currently play. They won the Havill Plate in 1975.

League rugby
When leagues were introduced for the 1987–88 season, Bideford was placed in Courage Cornwall/Devon, a regional league for Cornish and Devon-based clubs ranked in tier 8 of the English league system. In 1992, after four seasons in this division, the club finished as champions and thus were promoted to Tribute Western Counties West. They remained part of Tribute Western Counties West for six years. In the 1997–98 season, they finished last and were relegated, returning to Cornwall/Devon. In 2001, Bideford achieved promotion as runners-up and returned to the Tribute Western Counties West league. This promotion was short-lived; they were relegated the following year after a poor league campaign which saw just 1 win in 22 games. Two years later, Bideford sunk to their lowest ever league ranking and were thus relegated at the end of the 2004–05 season to Devon 1.

The 2006–07 season saw Bideford start to rebuild, and they finished second in the league behind champions Teignmouth, qualifying for a promotion play-off against the runners-up from Cornwall League 1, Liskeard-Looe.  Due to a better league record, Bideford had home advantage, and they managed a win, allowing a return to Cornwall/Devon. The next year saw Bideford not only stave off relegation with a mid-table finish, but also win the Devon Junior Cup for the third time, beating Teignmouth 23–7 in the final held at King George's Field. Bideford won the league and cup double during the 2010–11 season, first winning Tribute Devon/Cornwall with 25 wins from 26 games and then outclassing Crediton, 45–12 away, in the final of the Devon Intermediate Cup. A second intermediate cup victory followed the next year as Bideford beat Okehampton 51–17 in front of a home crowd of around 400 supporters.

In 2013, Bideford finished second in Western Counties West after losing a competitive title battle with eventual champions St Austell and qualified for the promotion play-off against Western Counties North runners-up, Wells. Despite having to travel to Somerset, Bideford survived a late fight back to clinch promotion. This promotion saw Bideford play in Tribute South West 1 West for the 2013–14 season, which, at tier 6, is the highest level the club have played at. In 2017–18 Bideford were relegated from Tribute South West 1 West after three years in the division, finishing second bottom to drop back down to Tribute Western Counties West.

Ground

Bideford play at King George's Fields next to Victoria Park on the western banks of the River Torridge, roughly 5 minutes walk from the town centre.  Unfortunately as there is no longer a railway station in the town, away supporters will have to rely on car or bus to get to the ground, although there is plenty of parking near by.   

The rugby ground consists of an enclosed main pitch with club house and covered standing terrace.  There are also several training pitches adjoining Victoria Park for 2nd XV and junior fixtures.  The current capacity of the main ground is around 2,000 (all standing), which has been reached on several occasions during the traditional Boxing Day fixture against neighbours Barnstaple.

Season summary

Notable former players
James Rogers
Roger 'Bill' Hopkins

Honours
 Devon Junior Cup winners (3): 1933, 1935, 2008
 Havill Plate winners: 1975
 Tribute Cornwall/Devon champions (2): 1991–92, 2010–11
 Cornwall 1 v Devon 1 promotion play-off winners: 2006–07
 Devon Intermediate Cup winners (2): 2011, 2012
 Tribute Western Counties (north v west) promotion play-off winners: 2012–13

Notes

See also
 Devon RFU

References

External links
 Bideford RFC
 Devon RFU

1926 establishments in England
Bideford
English rugby union teams
Rugby clubs established in 1926
Rugby union in Devon